Yuka may refer to:

Yuka (music), an Afro-Cuban style of music
Yuka (mammoth), mammoth specimen found in Yakutia, Russia
Manshu Yuka Kogyo K.K. Ssuningkai, a Japanese-German pre-WWII industrial co-operation

People
Yuka (name), a Japanese personal name
Yuka (singer) (born 1970), Japanese singer

See also
Yuca, a plant species
Yucca (disambiguation)